Dennis Frederick McCord (July 28, 1952 – February 7, 2005) was a professional ice hockey player who played three games in the National Hockey League for the Vancouver Canucks in 1974.

Born in Chatham, Ontario, McCord played his junior hockey for the London Knights and was selected 115th overall in the 1972 NHL Amateur Draft by the Vancouver Canucks. A skilled defender, he turned pro the following season and was assigned to the Seattle Totems, Vancouver's top minor-league affiliate.

McCord turned in two solid seasons in Seattle, posting totals of 28 and 37 points, and established himself as a solid NHL prospect. At the close of the 1973–74 campaign, McCord was given a three-game callup to Vancouver, which seemed to bode well for the future. However, his career would be derailed by injuries, and was able to appear in only 26 games for Seattle the following season. After one more season in the minors with the Fort Wayne Komets, he retired in 1976.

McCord died in 2005. In 2008, he was posthumously elected to the Chatham Sports Hall of Fame in his hometown of Chatham, Ontario.

Career statistics

External links

1952 births
2005 deaths
Canadian ice hockey defencemen
Fort Wayne Komets players
Ice hockey people from Ontario
Kitchener Rangers players
London Knights players
Seattle Totems (CHL) players
Seattle Totems (WHL) players
Sportspeople from Chatham-Kent
Toronto Marlboros players
Tulsa Oilers (1964–1984) players
Vancouver Canucks draft picks
Vancouver Canucks players
Canadian expatriate ice hockey players in the United States